Lenox District No. 4 Schoolhouse, now known as Lincoln Town Hall, is a historic school building located at Clockville in Madison County, New York.  It was built in 1854 and is a story clapboard frame structure on a concrete block foundation.  It was remodeled in 1929–1930.  It features a rooftop belfry containing the original 1970 schoolhouse bell.

It was added to the National Register of Historic Places in 1996.

References

School buildings on the National Register of Historic Places in New York (state)
School buildings completed in 1854
National Register of Historic Places in Madison County, New York